The  is a Japanese railway line operated by the private railway operator Hankyu Railway. It connects Umeda Station in downtown Osaka with Takarazuka Station in Takarazuka, Hyogo.

It has a branch line, the Minoo Line, and the Nose Electric Railway is another longer branch line. The Imazu Line connects at Takarazuka, but it is treated as a branch of the Kobe Line.

The line has numerous sharp curves from the line's origins as a tramway, built and opened by its predecessor . The sharp curves have long hindered high speed operation, contrasting to the Hankyu's other main lines, Kobe and Kyoto.

History
The Minoo Arima Electric Tramway opened the entire line on 10 March 1910 as 1435mm gauge dual track, electrified at 600 VDC. Although the line was not a prospect interurban as Takarazuka was not a big city, it saw initial success thanks to the company's aggressive measures. It strategically developed housing areas along the line for the increasing white-collar population who would commute to central Osaka by train. It also opened a zoo in Minoo (on the Minoo Line) in November 1910, a hot spring in Takarazuka in May 1911, and a ballpark in Toyonaka in 1913.

The track between Umeda and Jūsō was shared with the Kobe Line from 1920 to 1926 when the original double track was replaced by an elevated four-track line.

In comparison with the Kobe Line, cars used on the Takarazuka Line were small and old. Larger (Kobe Line standard) cars could not operate on the line until 1952 due to its small structure gauge. Small cars were eliminated in December 1963.
On 24 August 1969 the voltage was raised to 1500 VDC.
As the commuters increased, Hankyu's first 10-car operation began on the Takarazuka Line in March 1982.

Following the elevation work of Kawanishi-Noseguchi Station, through services to Nose Electric Railway began on 17 November 1997.

Since the 1970s there have been plans to build a spur line to Itami Airport from Sone Station. Although Hankyu shelved the plans in the 1980s due to capacity constraints, the plans were reportedly revived in 2017 and remain under consideration as of 2018.

Service patterns
As of diagram revision on 21 March 2015

All-stations service

Operated on weekday mornings

Simply "Limited Express" in English, operated from Kawanishi-Noseguchi to Umeda on weekday mornings. The trains are composed of 10 cars and the last car (Kawanishi side) is only for women.

From Nissei-Chūō on Nose Electric Railway to Umeda in the morning and vice versa on weekday evenings.

Stations
● : Trains stop.
| : Trains pass.
↑: Trains pass only in one direction.

Rolling stock
 1000 series EMU (from 28 November 2013)
 5100 series EMU
 6000 series EMU
 7000 series EMU
 8000 series EMU
 9000 series EMU
 Nose Electric Railway 6000 series EMU

Former
 1100 series EMU
 1200 series EMU
 2021 series EMU
 2100 series EMU
 3000 series EMU
 3100 series EMU

References
This article incorporates material from the corresponding article in the Japanese Wikipedia

Takarazuka Line
Rail transport in Osaka Prefecture
Rail transport in Hyōgo Prefecture
Osaka University transportation